Francesco da Castello (Flemish: Frans Van de Casteele) was a Flemish-Italian painter and manuscript illuminator, active in Rome.

Biography
The details of his life here were documented by the contemporary artist-biographer Giovanni Baglione. Francesco painted an Assumption of the Virgin and Saints for the first chapel of San Giacomo degli Spagnoli, Rome. He painted a Madonna and child with St Niccolo Vescovo and San Giuliano for the chapel of San Giuliano in the church of San Rocco of Ripetta. He painted for the palace of Ciriaco Mattei. He painted a 'Martiri Turritani' for the Basilica San Gavino in Porte Torres, Sardegna. He also was a manuscript illuminator. He died at the age of 80 years during the papacy of Pope Clement VIII (1592-1602).

He had two sons: one, Pietro, studied medicine and practiced in Palermo. The other, Michele Castello, (1588 - 28 October 1636) was mainly an illuminator, but completed a few altarpieces.

Maddalena Corvina was Castello's niece. She apprenticed under him for painting.

References

Footnotes

Sources

16th-century births
Year of death unknown
Flemish Renaissance painters
Mannerist painters
Manuscript illuminators
16th-century Italian painters
Italian male painters